Denis Igorevich Malinin (born 11 June 1983 in Pavlodar) is a Kazakhstani professional footballer. As of 2009, he plays for FC Kazakhmys. He also holds Russian citizenship.

External links
 

1983 births
Living people
Kazakhstani footballers
Expatriate footballers in Russia
Expatriate footballers in Lithuania
FC Irtysh Pavlodar players
FC Luch Vladivostok players
FC Zhemchuzhina Sochi players
Expatriate footballers in Kazakhstan
Russian expatriate sportspeople in Kazakhstan
FC Lokomotiv Moscow players
Association football forwards
Kazakhstan international footballers
People from Pavlodar